Spondylus ostreoides is a species of spiny oyster. It was only found once, off Raoul Island in the South Pacific Ocean.

Description
The only known specimen of S. ostreoides was found in 1885 and is currently in the British Museum of Natural History; only the shell has been preserved. It is heavily worn, but appears to have commarginal rather than radial sculpture, a character not found in other members of the genus, and typical of true oysters or, within the Pectinoidea, the Entoliidae. The cemented valve length is 13.8 mm, upper valve length is 12.5 mm.

References

Spondylidae